Fenoarivobe or Fenoarivo Afovoany or Fenoarivo Be is a town in central Madagascar in the region of Bongolava. 
It is the main city of the Fenoarivo-Afovoany district. It has a population of 28,616 after the 2018 census.

Rivers
Firavahana river

References

Populated places in Bongolava
fr:District de Fenoarivobe